Da Fat Rat wit da Cheeze is the second solo studio album by American rapper Lil' O, from Houston, Texas. It was released on November 21, 2000, via Game Face Entertainment. The album features Screwed Up Click members (Big Hawk, Big Moe, Big Pokey, E.S.G., Mike D, Z-Ro) and fellow Houston-based recording artists, including Big T, BFK, Poppy and Slim Thug among others. The album peaked at number 199 on the Billboard 200 and number 63 on the Top R&B/Hip-Hop Albums, making it his most successful album to date. Its lead single, "Back Back", peaked at number 62 on the Hot R&B/Hip-Hop Songs and number 65 on the R&B/Hip-Hop Airplay.

Track listing

Personnel

Oreoluwa Mitchell Magnus-Lawson – main artist
Kenneth Doniell Moore – featured artist (tracks: 2, 4, 8, 18)
Poppy of Grit Boys – featured artist (tracks: 2, 6, 19)
John Edward Hawkins – featured artist (tracks: 9, 12, 18)
Carmen Ginwright – featured artist (tracks: 2, 13)
Cedric Dormaine Hill – featured artist (tracks: 4, 13)
Joseph Wayne McVey IV – featured artist (tracks: 7, 16)
Christopher Barriere – featured artist (tracks: 12, 18)
Chris Ward – featured artist (track 2)
Milton Powell – featured artist (track 3)
Reuben Nero – featured artist (track 5)
A. Morgan – featured artist (track 10)
Stayve Jerome Thomas – featured artist (track 10)
Michael Dixon – featured artist (track 12)
Bad Actaz – featured artist (track 15)
Chad Jones – featured artist (track 15)
BFK – featured artist (track 16)
Slikk Breeze – featured artist (track 18)
Carl Jones – featured artist (track 19)
Derrick Blaylock – featured artist (track 20)
Blue of the Wreckshop Family – producer (tracks: 1, 5, 6, 7, 9, 16)
Willy Malone – producer (tracks: 2, 4, 10, 12, 18), mixing (tracks: 1-19), engineering
John "Swift" Catalon – producer (tracks: 3, 13, 17), mixing (tracks: 2, 13, 17)
Barry Risper – producer (tracks: 8, 18)
André Sargent – producer (tracks: 15, 20)
Drez – producer (track 1)
Robert Louis – executive producer
Gary L. Moon – mastering

Chart positions

References

External links

2001 albums
Lil' O albums